The Fall of Man, Adam and Eve or Adam and Eve in the earthly paradise is a 1628-1629 painting by Rubens, now in the Prado in Madrid. Once attributed to the minor Dutch artist Karel van Mander, it is now recognised as a work by Rubens.

It is a copy of the painting of the same subject by Titian, seen by Rubens during his 1628-1629 trip to Madrid for peace negotiations to end the Dutch Revolt. It reflects Raphael's influence on Titian and Jan Brueghel the Elder's influence on Rubens, who adds a parrot and changes Adam's posture, musculature, age and expression.

References

1628 paintings
Paintings by Peter Paul Rubens in the Museo del Prado
Paintings depicting Adam and Eve
Birds in art
Nude art
Foxes in art